The North Euboean Gulf (Voreios Evvoïkos Kolpos) is a gulf of the Aegean Sea. It separates the northern part of the island Euboea from the mainland of Central Greece. The narrow Euripus Strait, near Chalcis, connects the gulf to the south with the South Euboean Gulf. To the north, the gulf is connected with the Malian Gulf. The total length is approximately 60 km and its width ranges from approximately 10 to 20 km. It runs diagonally from northwest to southeast.

Islands
Lichades (largest islands: Manolia, Strongyli), Atalanti Island, Ktyponisi

Bays by the gulf
Agias Kyriakis Bay, south

Populated places by the gulf
Drosia, south
Livanates, southwest
Kamena Vourla, northwest
Nea Artaki, southeast
Psachna, southeast

Landforms of Boeotia
Euboea
Landforms of Phthiotis
Gulfs of Greece
Gulfs of the Aegean Sea
Landforms of Central Greece
Landforms of Euboea (regional unit)